The Oahu Open is a defunct tennis tournament that was part of ATP World Series and it was played for only one year in 1994. The event was played on outdoor hard courts at the Turtle Bay Hilton in Oahu, Hawaii in the United States. Wayne Ferreira won the singles title, while Tom Nijssen and Cyril Suk partnered to win the doubles.

Finals

Singles

Doubles

See also
 Hawaii Open

External links
 ITF tournament edition details
 ATP tournament profile

 
Defunct tennis tournaments in the United States
Oahu
Oahu
Tennis in Hawaii
Oahu
Recurring sporting events established in 1994
Recurring events disestablished in 1994
1994 establishments in Hawaii
1994 disestablishments in Hawaii